PE may refer to:

Science and technology

Computing and telecommunication
 P/E cycle of flash memory
 Phase encoding, another name for Manchester code
 Portable Executable, a computer file format
 Windows Preinstallation Environment, a lightweight version of Microsoft Windows
 Progressive enhancement, a strategy for web design
 Protocol encryption, a feature of some peer-to-peer file-sharing clients
 Provider edge router, a router between computer networks
 Project Euler, a problem solving website

Medical conditions
 Pectus excavatum, a structural deformity of the anterior thoracic wall in which the sternum and rib cage are shaped abnormally
 Pleural effusion, excess fluid accumulation in the pleural cavity, the fluid-filled space surrounding the lungs
 Pre-eclampsia, a disorder of pregnancy
 Premature ejaculation
 Pulmonary embolism, a blockage of the pulmonary artery

Medical interventions
 Penis enlargement
 Phenylephrine, a common over-the-counter decongestant
 Phenytoin equivalent, used to measure doses of fosphenytoin
 Physical exercise
 Prolonged exposure therapy, a form of behavior therapy designed to treat posttraumatic stress disorder

Organic chemistry
 Pentaerythritol, a polyol
 Phenylephrine, a common over-the-counter decongestant
 Phenytoin equivalent, used to measure doses of fosphenytoin
 Phosphatidyl ethanolamine
 Phycoerythrin, a water-soluble protein used as a fluorescent marker in microscopy and flow cytometry
 Polyethylene, a common plastic polymer

Physics
 Positron emission, a type of radioactive decay
 Potential energy, the energy stored in a body or in a system due to its position in a force field or due to its configuration
 Proton emission, a type of radioactive decay
 Protective earth, a type of electrical protective system
 Reduction potential, the negative logarithm of electron activity

Other uses in science and technology
 AEG PE, a German World War I armored ground-attack aircraft
 Population equivalent, a concept used in sanitary engineering
 Present Era, a year numbering system commonly used in archaeology that uses 1950s as the epoch marker
 Professional Engineer, a post-nominal suffix indicating such a certification
 Primary energy, an energy form found in nature that has not been subjected to any human engineered conversion process

Arts and media
 "P.E." (Cow and Chicken), a 1998 television episode
 Parasite Eve (video game), on the original PlayStation
 Pineapple Express (film), a 2008 American action-comedy film starring Seth Rogen
 Power electronics (music), a type of noise music
 The Press-Enterprise, a newspaper serving the Inland Empire in Southern California
 Private eye, a character class in the MMORPG Neocron
 Public Enemy (group), a hip hop group from Long Island, New York
 Minecraft: Pocket Edition, the mobile version of the video game

In business and economics
 P/E ratio, or price-to-earnings ratio
 Performance Evaluation, a journal
 Professional Engineer, a post-nominal suffix indicating such a certification
 Private equity, equity investments in companies that are not traded on a public stock exchange
 Permanent establishment, a fixed place of business establishing taxable presence of a business in a host country

Businesses and organizations
 Air Europe Italy (IATA Code 1989–2008)
 People Express Airlines (1980s) (IATA Code 1981–1987) 
 Pacific Electric, a defunct Los Angeles rail transit company
 PerkinElmer, an American technology company 
 Army Police (Brazil), (Portuguese: Polícia do Exército) a Brazilian Army Police force
 Army Police (Portugal), (Portuguese: Polícia do Exército) a Portuguese Army Police force

Places
 PE postcode area, UK, covering Peterborough
 Pernambuco, a state of Brazil
 Peru (ISO 3166-1 alpha-2 and NATO country code PE)
 Port Elizabeth, a city in South Africa
 Prince Edward Island, a Canadian province

Other uses
 Pakistani English, the variant of English language spoken in Pakistan
 Physical education
 Princess Elizabeth Challenge Cup, a rowing event at Henley Royal Regatta

See also
Pe (disambiguation)
Pee (disambiguation)